All Saints Church at Monie is a historic Episcopal church located at Venton, Somerset County, Maryland. It is a single-story Carpenter Gothic-style building, five bays across by one room deep built in 1881. It is a well-preserved example of a small, rural Carpenter Gothic church taken from the designs of Richard Upjohn. Also on the property is the cemetery with 18th, 19th, and 20th century burial sites and markers.

It was listed on the National Register of Historic Places in 1990.

References

External links
, including photo in 1985, at Maryland Historical Trust
All Saints' Monie, Somerset Cemeteries Project webpage

Episcopal church buildings in Maryland
Churches on the National Register of Historic Places in Maryland
Carpenter Gothic church buildings in Maryland
Churches in Somerset County, Maryland
Churches completed in 1881
19th-century Episcopal church buildings
National Register of Historic Places in Somerset County, Maryland
1881 establishments in Maryland